Georges Marie Denis Gabriel Trouillot (7 May 1851 – 20 November 1916) was a French Radical politician. 
He played a central role in developing the law of 1901 that governed associations such as agricultural cooperative.
He was Minister of the Colonies in 1898 and again in 1909–10.
He was Minister of Industry, Commerce and Posts in 1902–05 and again in 1905–06.
He published several books, including both poetry and political subjects.

Early years (1851–89)

Georges Marie Denis Gabriel Trouillot was born on 7 May 1851 in Champagnole, Jura.
He studied classics at the Jesuit college in Dole, then studied law in Lyon.
He became an attorney in Lons-le-Saunier.
On 2 August 1870 he was appointed sub-lieutenant in the National Mobile Guard of the Jura department.
He was one of the founders of the Jura Republican Union.
He was a member of the general council of Jura for the canton of Beaufort, then municipal councilor in 1877.
He was elected mayor of Lons-le-Saunier.
In 1889 he was named president of the Bar.

National politics (1889–1916)

Deputy

Trouillot ran in the general election of 1889, and was elected in the first round for the constituency of Lons-le-Saunier.
He joined the Union of Progressives and Radical Left in the chamber.
He was also elected president of the Jura departmental assembly.
He was reelected deputy in 1893 and in 1898.
In 1891 Trouillot proposed a law against abortion and contraception. 
Discussion was long delayed, and the proposal was not passed by the Senate until January 1919.

Trouillot introduced a bill to let anyone who held the degree of licence en droit practice as an avocat, removing the authority of the Order of Advocates to approve new members of their profession. 
In response, the Paris Order struck him off their register. 
The case went to court and Trouillot was reinstated on the basis that the disbarment hearings had not followed due process. 
The decision caused outrage among the leading advocates.
Trouillot assisted René Viviani in introduction of the law of 1 December 1900 that allowed women to practice as advocates following a campaign by Jeanne Chauvin, who became the second woman to be admitted to the profession.

Minister of Colonies

The public scandal of the Dreyfus Affair blew up in January 1898 with Émile Zola's publication in L'Aurore of his open letter entitled J'Accuse…!.
Trouillot accused the premier Jules Méline of practicing the politics of division. 
Méline resigned during the debate of 14 June 1898.
Trouillot was appointed to the new Radical government formed late that month.
He was Minister of the Colonies in the second cabinet of Henri Brisson, and held office from 28 June 1898 to 26 October 1898.

Trouillot saw little value in the French enclaves in India, and told the Foreign Minister that he would be willing to give them all to the British in exchange for the Gambia.
The Polynesian island of Mangareva was more important to him than the French possessions in India.
His views were not shared by the inhabitants of Mahé, who said it was capable of "rivaling in salubriousness with the best of sanatoriums of the Presidency of Madras."

This was a time of rapid colonial expansion in Africa, where officers were given much freedom of action as long as they succeeded in acquiring territory.
Trouillot said in a speech in 1898, "Let us give ourselves a birth incentive so that we can once again become the world's foremost colonizing people."
In a decree of 7 August 1898 Trouillot created an office of financial control for French West Africa under the direction of the governor-general. 
This gave the colonialist a significant increase in independence from the metropolitan government.

In July Trouillot wrote to the Minister of Foreign Affairs, Théophile Delcassé, that Major Jean-Baptiste Marchand was approaching Fashoda on the Nile, and the British general Herbert Kitchener would soon also arrive there. 
Delcassé did not reply until September, when he said Marchand should return before reaching Fashoda. By that time it was too late to prevent the encounter, so the letter was mainly so that the French could disavow Marchand if things went wrong, as it did in the Fashoda Incident.

Law of Associations

Trouillot played a central role in developing the Law of Associations.
He was rapporteur for all the parliamentary debates on this law, working closely with the head of government, Pierre Waldeck-Rousseau.
The law defined the legal status of associations such as mutual societies and agricultural cooperatives, and was developed through study of associations in the Jura, elsewhere in Europe and in the United States.
According to Trouillot, hostility to religious congregations had always been the reason why efforts to allow freedom of association had failed in the past,

Trouillot's answer was to curb the powers of associations to prevent abuse.
The law required almost all the religious orders and congregations in France to obtain legal authorization from parliament, and disallowed any member of an unauthorized order or congregation from teaching or managing a school.
The Law of Associations was passed in July 1901.
The church complained that the law resulted in a cascade of closures of schools and ecclesiastical establishments.

Other activities

Trouillot was Minister of Industry, Commerce and Posts from 7 June 1902 to 18 January 1905 in the cabinet of Émile Combes.
Trouillot, who was known for his anti-clericalism, followed a traditional policy in dealing with industrial issues.
In March 1904 his predecessor Alexandre Millerand complained that his social program had been replaced by a program of "monk-hunting".
However, during a strike of textile workers in the fall of 1903 Trouillot agreed in substance with the strikers' complaints against the manufacturers, and the Chamber voted almost unanimously for arbitration to resume, and for a thorough inquiry into the textile industry.
Trouillot was again Minister of Industry, Commerce and Posts from 12 November 1905 to 9 March 1906 in the second cabinet of Maurice Rouvier.

Trouillot was elected Senator for the Jura  on 7 January 1906.
He was again Minister of the Colonies from 24 July 1909 to 2 November 1910 in the cabinet of Aristide Briand.
On 31 May 1910 he decreed that the administrators of French Equatorial Africa had the power to adjudicate offenses committed by the indigenous people that could not be tried by the French courts.
Through his influence, most young men in the Jura were posted to the nearby garrisons at Lons-le-Saunier and Bourg for their military service.
An unplanned consequence was that at the outbreak of World War I (1914–18) the department suffered disproportionate losses.
Trouillot's canton of Beaufort suffered particularly large losses.

Georges Trouillot died in Paris on 20 November 1916.
His daughter married the future colonial administrator Lucien Saint.

Publications
Trouillot was a distinguished man of letters, and published several books.
These included Du contrat d'association (1902) and Pour l'idée laïque (1906).
He also contributed to several journals, notably Voltaire and Le Siècle.

Notes

Sources

1851 births
1916 deaths
People from Champagnole
Politicians from Bourgogne-Franche-Comté
Independent Radical politicians
French Ministers of Commerce, Industry, Posts, and Telegraphs
French Ministers of the Colonies
Members of the 5th Chamber of Deputies of the French Third Republic
Members of the 6th Chamber of Deputies of the French Third Republic
Members of the 7th Chamber of Deputies of the French Third Republic
Members of the 8th Chamber of Deputies of the French Third Republic
French Senators of the Third Republic
Senators of Jura (department)